The Silesian Wikipedia is the Silesian edition of Wikipedia. It was started on 26 May 2008.

History 

The first attempt to launch the Silesian Wikipedia project took place in March 2006, but because of negative comments in the discussion section, the proposal was rejected.
In 2007 Wikipedia officially registered the Silesian language in its list of languages. The International Linguistic Organization SIL International followed this step on 18 July 2007 and International Organization for Standardization (ISO) assigned it the ISO code "szl".

A second application for a Wikipedia project in the Silesian language was submitted on 19 March 2008 as a result of discussions on the removal of articles written in Silesian language, which remained in the Polish edition of Wikipedia (in Silesia Wikiproject). After the initial acceptance of the proposal (100% positive, 0% negative votes) 31 March 2008, a test project was created in the Incubator Wikimedia projects. The following month it contained 100 articles in Silesian, including more than 1,800 separate pages. After two months all eight requirements necessary to create a new Wikipedia were implemented and finally Silesian Wikipedia was founded on 26 May 2008. The 1,000th article was included on 15 November 2008.

In October 2010, the Silesian Wikipedia was mentioned as one of the arguments for Silesian to become one of the regional languages in Poland. The project of the law implementing Silesian as a regional language was introduced to Sejm by parliament member Marek Plura.

Statistics 
Data from   :

References

External links 

 Silesian Wikipedia
  Silesian Wikipedia mobile version (not fully supported)

Wikipedias by language
Internet properties established in 2008
Wikipedia
Polish encyclopedias
Czech encyclopedias